Christ Church, Ironville is a Grade II listed parish church in the Church of England in Ironville, Derbyshire.

History
The church was built between 1851 and 1852 to the designs of Henry Isaac Stevens for the Butterley Iron Company. It was consecrated on 16 April 1852, by the Bishop of Lichfield.

Parish status
The church is in a joint parish with
St James' Church, Riddings

Organ
A pipe organ was built by Thomas Christopher Lewis in 1876. A specification of the organ can be found on the National Pipe Organ Register.

References

Ironville
Ironville
Churches completed in 1852